Puli Alam, also spelled Pul-i-Alam or Pol-e Alam, is a district of Logar Province, Afghanistan.
The population of Puli Alam is estimated at around 108,000, which is composed of Pashtuns, Tajiks and a few others. The capital of the district is Puli Alam city, which is also the provincial capital.

Puli Alam has undergone reconstruction work after the fall of Taliban government.

A Provincial Reconstruction Team (PRT) of the Czech Republic is based in the district.

Security and politics
It was reported on 23 November 2009 that unknown armed men destroyed a girls' school in the district's headquarters.

See also
Districts of Afghanistan

References

External links

"Puli Alam District – Logar Province – Afghanistan" map, January 2004, Afghanistan Information Management Services (AIMS)

Districts of Logar Province